Edward B. Rust (May 8, 1883 - September 27, 1958) was an American architect. He designed many buildings in Los Angeles, California, including at least four apartment buildings.

Early life
Rust was born on a farm in South Pasadena, California on May 8, 1883. He attended Stanford University from 1902 to 1905, and the University of California, Berkeley from 1906 to 1908.

Career

Rust designed several apartment buildings in Los Angeles, California, including Roberta Apartments at 2424 4th Avenue in South Los Angeles, completed in 1921; the Los Altos Apartments in the Spanish Colonial Revival architectural style, located at 4121 Wilshire Boulevard and completed in 1925; and the Edwards and Wildey Building at 2160 Colorado Boulevard in Eagle Rock. His Town House Apartments, located at 80 North Euclid Avenue in Pasadena and completed in 1926, is a contributing property to the Pasadena Civic Center District, listed on the National Register of Historic Places.

In West Hollywood in 1938, Rust designed a house for Donald L. Linder in the Streamline Moderne style. It was subsequently purchased by actor Anderson Lawler, who rented it to actors Orson Welles and Rita Hayworth.

Rust designed the windmill of the Van de Kamp's Holland Dutch Bakeries. By the time of his death, he was described by the Los Angeles Times as "a widely known architect."

Personal life and death
Rust was married twice. With his first wife, nee Constance Maclintock, he had a son, and he had a daughter with his second wife, Veronica. They resided in San Gabriel, California.

Rust died on September 27, 1958 in Los Angeles County, California. His funeral was held at the St. Therese Roman Catholic Church in Alhambra, and he was buried at the Resurrection Cemetery in Montello.

References

1883 births
1958 deaths
People from South Pasadena, California
People from San Gabriel, California
Stanford University alumni
University of California, Berkeley alumni
Architects from Los Angeles